Stefan Bror Karl Örnskog (born 4 April 1969) is a Swedish ice hockey player whose professional career as a left wing/centre lasted from 1987 to 2001 and was capped with a gold medal at the Lillehammer 1994 Winter Olympics in neighboring Norway, as well as with a silver and a bronze medal at the World Championships.

Playing career 
A native of Jönköping, the capital of Jönköping County in southern Sweden's Småland province, Örnskog enjoyed a 14-season career, playing 12 of them for his home town club HV71 in the country's top elite league, Elitserien.  The 1994–95 season and part of the 1999–2000 season was spent in Finland playing for JYP in the SM-liiga. On 26 December 2001, Örnskogs's jersey, no. 15, along with Fredrik Stillman's no. 14, was retired during a ceremony before a match against Frölunda HC in Kinnarps Arena.

Awards 
 Gold medal at the Winter Olympics in 1994.
 Bronze medal at the World Championships in 1994.
 Silver medal at the World Championships in 1995.
 Elitserien champion with HV71 in 1995.

Career statistics

Regular season and playoffs

International

References

1969 births
Swedish ice hockey centres
HV71 players
Ice hockey players at the 1994 Winter Olympics
Olympic ice hockey players of Sweden
Medalists at the 1994 Winter Olympics
Olympic medalists in ice hockey
Olympic gold medalists for Sweden
Ice hockey players with retired numbers
Sportspeople from Jönköping
Living people